Geoff Bloes (born June 3, 1985) is a former American soccer player.

Career

College
Bloes attended Middletown High School and played college soccer at Shippensburg University, where he set new school records for goals (51) and points (130), and finished second in school history with 28 assists. As a senior in 2007, he scored 13 goals and 35 points en route to his second straight Pennsylvania State Athletic Conference Athlete of the Year Award; he was also named the Division II Northeast Region Player of the Year. Bloes was a three-time All-PSAC First Team selection, and in 2007, he became only the second player in school history to earn Division II First Team All-American honors.

Professional
Bloes turned professional when he signed with Harrisburg City Islanders of the USL Second Division in 2008. He made his professional debut on June 28, 2008, as a substitute in a 1–1 tie with the Wilmington Hammerheads. On February 2, 2010, Harrisburg City announced the re-signing of Bloes for the 2010 season.

Geoff is currently a Logistics Manager in Elizabethtown, Pennsylvania, for an animal health company.

References

External links
Harrisburg City Islanders bio
Shippensburg bio

1985 births
Living people
American soccer players
Penn FC players
USL Second Division players
USL Championship players
Soccer players from Pennsylvania
Association football midfielders